Friedrich Pustet GmbH & Co. KG is a German publishing firm, located in Regensburg.

The original home of the Pustets was the Republic of Venice, where the name Bustetto is common. Probably in the seventeenth century, the founder of the Ratisbon line immigrated to South Germany, where one of his descendants, Anton Pustet, lived as a poor bookbinder in the Lower Bavarian borough of Hals (near Passau) at the close of the eighteenth century. To him and his wife Anna (née Scheuerocker) was born on 25 March 1798, a son, Friedrich Pustet.

Having learned bookbinding under his father, Friedrich started a small book-store in Passau in 1819, and in 1822 founded a separate printing establishment. This business developed, and in 1826 he was able to transfer his publishing business to Ratisbon. Establishing business relations with prominent Catholic authors, he extended the range of his publications to all branches of literature, while paying special attention to theology. 

To extend his business undertakings, in 1833 Pustet set up one of the first printing-machines, and in 1836 erected near Ratisbon a paper factory, for which he procured the first paper machine in Bavaria. In 1845, he began printing liturgical works; with this he associated a department for church music, with the co-operation of Dr. Proske, for the purpose of carrying out the latter's ideas for the reform of ecclesiastical music. Men like Dr. Witt, Dr. Haberl, Haller, later supported this department. 

In 1860, he handed over the business to his sons Friedrich (b. 1831), Karl (b. 1839), and Klemens (b. 1833), and two years later acquired in Munich the Royal Bavarian Central Schoolbook-Publishing Company, which he conducted until 1874. He died on 5 March 1882. 

The sons continued the expansion of the business. Friedrich chose for his department liturgical publications, Karl German works, and Klemens the paper factory. The success of Friedrich earned for him in 1870 the title "Typographus S. R. Congregationis"; the Vatican commissioned Pustet to print the editio typica of all the liturgical works. Branch firms were established in New York (1865), Cincinnati, Ohio (1867), and Rome (1898).

Friedrich died on 4 August 1902. Klemens had died before him (1898), and Karl's death followed on 17 January 1910. Karl, who was a Privy Counsellor of Commerce, expanded the German publications: amongst those were the "Regensburger Marienkalender" and the illustrated family magazine, the "Deutscher Hausschatz". 

The next generation of the Pustet firm were Friedrich Pustet, son of Friedrich, and Ludwig, son of Karl.

References

Attribution
 The entry cites:
Denk, Friedrich Pustet, Vater u. Sohn. Zwei Lebensbilder, sugleich eine Gesch. Des Hauses Pustet (Ratisbon, 1904).

External links

 

Book publishing companies of Germany
Publishing companies of Germany